Extra Mile is the third studio album by the American country music band Shenandoah. It was released May 2, 1990 (see 1990 in country music) on Columbia Records. Their final album for the label, it produced five chart singles on the Billboard country charts. In order of release, these were "Next to You, Next to Me", "Ghost in This House", "I Got You", "The Moon Over Georgia" and "When You Were Mine". "Next to You, Next to Me" was the band's fourth Number One, and all the others except "When You Were Mine" were Top Ten hits. Extra Mile is certified gold by the RIAA.

Track listing

Personnel
As listed in liner notes.

Shenandoah
 Ralph Ezell – bass guitar, backing vocals
 Mike McGuire – drums, backing vocals
 Marty Raybon – lead vocals
 Jim Seales – electric guitar, backing vocals
 Stan Thorn – keyboards, backing vocals

Other musicians
 Mickey Buckins – percussion
 Robert Byrne – acoustic and electric guitars
 Bill Darnell – backing vocals
 Paul Franklin – pedal steel guitar, Dobro
 Owen Hale – drums
 Rick Hall – backing vocals
 Carl Jackson – acoustic guitar
 Lenny LeBlanc – bass guitar, backing vocals
 Mac McAnally – acoustic guitar
 Steve Nathan – keyboards
 Mark O'Connor – fiddle, mandolin
 John Willis – acoustic guitar

Charts

Weekly charts

Year-end charts

Certifications

References

[ Extra Mile] at Allmusic

1990 albums
Columbia Records albums
Shenandoah (band) albums
Albums produced by Robert Byrne (songwriter)